Meghan Strange is an American actor. She is best known for her roles as Ruby from The Land Before Time television series and Robin from Sofia the First. She also voiced the character Harley Quinn on Batman: The Brave and the Bold and has appeared in a number of short films and children's TV shows.

Career
Strange began her acting career as a member of a chorus line in the 1994 Woody Allen film Bullets Over Broadway. She would later make an appearance as the character Marcy on a January 1999 episode of the soap opera As the World Turns, as well as the 1999 films Entropy and 30 Days.

In 2007, she landed a recurring role as Ruby on the Cartoon Network series The Land Before Time, based on the long-running film series, appearing in every episode as well as the direct-to-video film The Land Before Time XIV: Journey of the Brave. She also voiced Penny on the English version of the Disney Channel series Stitch! between 2008 and 2010. Strange would work for several Disney Junior programs such as Special Agent Oso (as the Paw Pilot), Doc McStuffins (as Anna), and Sofia the First (as Robin), as well as the Sofia the First TV movie Once Upon a Princess. On a 2010 episode of Batman: The Brave and the Bold she provided the voice for the villain Harley Quinn. Strange would also appear in a 2013 episode of the thriller series Criminal Minds as Catherine Hatchitt.

Filmography

Films

Television

References

External links
 

Living people
American film actresses
American television actresses
American voice actresses
Year of birth missing (living people)
21st-century American actresses
20th-century American actresses